The 1994 Sacramento State Hornets football team represented California State University, Sacramento as a member of the American West Conference (AWC) during the 1994 NCAA Division I-AA football season. Led by Mike Clemons in his second and final season as head coach, Sacramento State compiled an overall record of 5–5 with a mark of 2–1 in conference play, placing second in the AWC. The team outscored its opponents 255 to 214 for the season. The Hornets played home games at Hornet Stadium in Sacramento, California.

Schedule

References

Sacramento State
Sacramento State Hornets football seasons
Sacramento State Hornets football